Metilia amazonica is a species of mantis of the family Acanthopidae that was historically Acanthops amazonica.

Range
Brazil.

References

Mantodea of South America
Acanthopidae
Insects described in 1830